The 2016–17 VfL Bochum season is the 79th season in club history.

Review and events

Matches

Legend

Friendly matches

2. Bundesliga

League table

Results summary

Results by round

Matches

DFB-Pokal

Squad

Squad and statistics

Squad, appearances and goals scored

|}

Transfers

Summer

In:

Out:

Winter

In:

Out:

Sources

External links
 2016–17 VfL Bochum season at Weltfussball.de 
 2016–17 VfL Bochum season at kicker.de 
 2016–17 VfL Bochum season at Fussballdaten.de 

Bochum
VfL Bochum seasons